Muhammad Mansur Ali (16  January 1917 – 3  November 1975) was a Bangladeshi politician who was a close confidant of Sheikh Mujibur Rahman, the founding leader of Bangladesh. A senior leader of the Awami League, Mansur also served as the Prime Minister of Bangladesh in 1975.

Early life
Muhammad Mansur Ali was born on 16 January 1917 to a Bengali Muslim family of Sarkars in the village of Kuripara in Qazipur, Sirajganj (then under Pabna District), Bengal Presidency. His father's name was Haraf Ali Sarkar. Mansur pursued his education in Kolkata Islamia College (now Maulana Azad College). He would pursue a MA degree in economics and law from the Aligarh Muslim University. During this period Mansur became an active member of the Muslim League, which under Muhammad Ali Jinnah demanded a separate Muslim state of Pakistan. He served as the vice-president of the Pabna District Muslim League from 1946 to 1950. He received training at Jessore Cantonment as a captain in PLG (Pakistan Lancers Group) in 1948. Since then he was widely known as Captain Mansur. Deciding to practise law, he enrolled in the Pabna District Court in 1951.

Political career
He would soon be elected member of Awami League's central executive committee and president of its Pabna District unit. Mansur was arrested by police in 1952 for helping to organise protests against the declaration of Urdu as the sole official language, in what became known as the Language Movement. Mansur and his party demanded that Bengali also receive recognition and the provinces be granted autonomy. After his release, Mansur was elected a member of the East Pakistan Legislative Assembly in 1954 as a candidate of the United Front alliance of various political parties. In the cabinet headed by Ataur Rahman Khan, Mansur served in different periods as the province's minister of law, parliamentary affairs, food, agriculture, commerce and industry. Mansur was re-arrested in the aftermath of the coup détat led by Ayub Khan, who became President of Pakistan and imposed martial law. He would remain incarcerated from 1958 to 1959.
Mansur Ali played an important role in the Six point movement led by Sheikh Mujibur Rahman, who demanded substantial regional autonomy and opposed the military regime. In the 1970 elections, he was elected member of the legislative assembly. At the outbreak of the Bangladesh Liberation War in 1971, Mansur went underground to organise a government in exile. Mansur became the minister of finance in the Mujibnagar government. After the independence of Bangladesh, Mansur was the minister of communications and later home affairs. After the introduction of a one-party, presidential system in 1975, Mujib became the President of Bangladesh. Mansur was appointed the prime minister. He helped Mujib organise the Bangladesh Krishak Sramik Awami League.

Personal life 
He married Begum Amina the daughter of a District Judge from the area of Rangpur. They had five sons and one daughter. His eldest son Dr Mohammad Selim became an advocate from Bangladesh and studied for the BAR at Lincoln's Inn, he is a prominent political figure and became Presidium member for Awami League and held the position of Chairman of Bangladesh Foreign affairs committee as well as being an MP representing his fathers constituency Kazipur in Sirajganj District. His second son Mohammad Nasim also became a leader of prominence and was MP and held ministerial posts of Telecoms and Home for Awami League government between 1996 and 2001.

Death
On 15 August 1975, Mujib was assassinated along with his family by a group of military officers. The 15 August coup d'état was masterminded by Khondaker Mostaq Ahmad, a disgruntled member of Mujib's regime who would become president. Mansur went into hiding immediately after the killing. When Khondaker Mostaq Ahmad invited Awami League leaders such as Mansur Ali, Syed Nazrul Islam, A. H. M. Qamaruzzaman and Tajuddin Ahmad to join his government, they refused. They were arrested by the army on 23 August 1975. Refusing to support Ahmad's regime, they were murdered while incarcerated in the Dhaka Central Jail on 3 November, which was one of the key points for the 3 November coup, which already ousted Ahmad from power again.

References

External links
 

1917 births
1975 deaths
Bangladeshi Muslims
Aligarh Muslim University alumni
Maulana Azad College alumni
Awami League politicians
Bangladesh Liberation War
Bangladeshi people who died in prison custody
Prisoners who died in Bangladeshi detention
University of Calcutta alumni
Recipients of the Independence Day Award
Finance ministers of Bangladesh
Communications ministers of Bangladesh
Prime Ministers of Bangladesh
Home Affairs ministers of Bangladesh
Road Transport and Bridges ministers of Bangladesh
Pakistan Army officers
20th-century Bengalis
20th-century Muslims
People from Sirajganj District
Bangladesh Krishak Sramik Awami League executive committee members
Bangladesh Krishak Sramik Awami League central committee members